Robert “Bob” Perkins (born December 6, 1933) is an American radio personality. He is a jazz program host and DJ for WRTI.  His radio career began in 1964 in Detroit, Michigan. He went on to work for WDAS and while in Philadelphia,  in 1997, he joined WRTI-FM Temple University Radio. He was known for his laid-back and mellow style. Perkins was also one of Pennsylvania's favorite night-time jazz listeners, in the Philadelphia area.  One of his well-known sayings is "This is BP with the GM!". Meaning "Bob Perkins with the good music."  He is also an accomplished radio news journalist and a First Call Master of Ceremonies for regional jazz music events. He has earned well over forty different honors and awards from major government, artistic, journalistic and community organizations. Information about his on-air schedule may be found at  WRTI's website.

Radio career summary

Perkins is the PM drive time jazz radio personality and host for WRTI-FM Temple University Radio in Philadelphia. He has been with the station since 1997. His knowledge of jazz programming was instrumental to a significant increase in weekday Jazz listener-ship and a doubling of the Sunday Jazz audience for his time slot.

Perkins started his radio career in Detroit over five years, from 1964 to 1969. After breaking in as a DJ and announcer at WGPR-FM, he then expanded to news at WCHB-AM while also working as jazz program director for its twin, WCHD-FM. He continued to grow, working as newsman and assistant director at WJLB-AM in Detroit, before his career path returned him to Philadelphia, where in 1969 he joined WDAS-AM / FM as a newsman and after two years became News Director there; after another year he also became the Editorial Director. His distinctive deep voice and progressive points of view became an on-air signature for the fast-growing FM and AM operations at WDAS over 19 years during the 1970's and '80's. From 1988 to 1997 he hosted a well-known jazz program on Saturday nights on WHYY-FM before moving to WRTI.

Perkins is also a first-call jazz MC. He regularly serves as master of ceremonies for major annual and special concert events in the region, such as the previous and very popular Mellon Jazz Festival Concert Series. Perkins is currently engaged for the annual Cape May Jazz Festival Concert Series and the Tony Williams Jazz Festival Concert Series.

Print media and other projects

Perkins had a five-year relationship with The Philadelphia Tribune, where he wrote commentary on government, society and public affairs. He also wrote editorials and other articles for the former Philadelphia New Observer. Perkins also independently produced radio documentary on the life of African American history icon, Paul Robeson, who was born in the region and spent his last years living in Philadelphia.

Personal life

Perkins was born on December 6, 1933. He credits his love for radio to his father who repaired radios as a hobby when he was young. He got his first job in radio during a trip to visit his two brothers in Detroit in 1964. Perkins wandered into the station at WGPR-FM and got a position as on-air DJ and Announcer. He has attended two White House Presidential news conferences - one of Gerald Ford's and one of Jimmy Carter's. Perkins was born and raised in South Philadelphia and currently lives in Glenside, Pennsylvania, with his wife Sheila.

Honors and awards

Some of Bob Perkins' major honors and awards for career accomplishments include: The Kal Rudman Milestones in Radio Award; The Mellon Jazz Community Service Award, 2002); Inducted to the Philadelphia Broadcast Hall of Fame, 2003 and the Broadcast Pioneers of Philadelphia  Hall of Fame (Enshrined with Philadelphia Broadcast Legends John Facenda, Larry Kane, Dick Clark, Herb Clarke and Ed Bradley, to name a few); City of Philadelphia Proclamation by Mayor John Street for Outstanding Contribution to Philadelphia Jazz, 2007; State of Pennsylvania Proclamations at the State House of Representatives and the State Senate for Outstanding Contribution by a Pennsylvania Resident to Jazz, 2007; U.S. House of Representatives Proclamation by Congressman Chaka Fattah for Outstanding Contribution by a Pennsylvania Resident to Jazz, 2007 (pictured above). Philadelphia honored him in 2017 when he was inducted in Philadelphia Music Walk of Fame.

See also

Jazz Bridge
Hal Jackson
Yvonne Daniels
Joseph Deighton Gibson Jr.
Lavada Durst
Daddy-O Daylie
Black-appeal stations

References

External links
WRTI homepage
Broadcast Pioneers of Philadelphia website
 

African-American radio personalities
American radio DJs
American radio journalists
Place of birth missing (living people)
Radio personalities from Detroit
Radio personalities from Philadelphia
1933 births
Living people
People from Cheltenham, Pennsylvania
Radio and television announcers
21st-century African-American people
20th-century African-American people